Karimabad (also Romanized as Karīmābād) is a village in Kenevist Rural District, in the Central District of Mashhad County, Razavi Khorasan Province, Iran. At the 2006 census, its population was 536, in 140 families.

References 

Populated places in Mashhad County